The Reigolil-Pirihueico Fault (Spanish: Falla Reigolil-Pirihueico) is a second-order geological fault located in the Chilean and Argentine Andes. As the name implies, it runs from Pirihueico Lake to Reigolil Valley. Reigolil-Pirihueico Fault run in north–south direction and is roughly parallel to the larger Liquiñe-Ofqui Fault, which is located 15 to 20 km west of it to which it is considered a branch of. East of Reigolil-Pirihueico Fault, close or along the Argentina-Chile boundary, are a string of volcanoes pliocene to quaternary volcanoes: Lanín, Pirihueico, Huanquihué, Quelguenco and Chihuío.

Geographically the fault is mostly inside two Chilean communes, Panguipulli and Curarrehue. Settlements above the fault include the hamlet of Puerto Pirihueico and the town of Curarrehue.  

Seismic faults of Argentina
Seismic faults of Chile
Geology of Araucanía Region
Geology of Los Ríos Region
Strike-slip faults
Mapuche language